Eagle Point Lake is a lake in Washington County, in the U.S. state of Minnesota.

Eagle Point Lake was so named for the fact eagles nested on its peninsula.

See also
List of lakes in Minnesota

References

Lakes of Minnesota
Lakes of Washington County, Minnesota